Ignacio Velázquez Rivera (born 1953) is a Spanish politician who served as mayor of Melilla from 1991 and became the first Mayor-President on 14 March 1995 when the enclave on the north coast of Africa became an autonomous community. He held the post until 1998.

Velázquez was born in Ceuta, the other Spanish enclave in mainland Africa.

References

Living people
1953 births
Mayor-Presidents of Melilla
Members of the Assembly of Melilla
People from Ceuta
People from Melilla